Jane Turner entered the Federal Bureau of Investigation (FBI) as a Special Agent in October 1978. She was assigned to the Seattle Division and became the first female SWAT member and the first female Profile Coordinator. She was involved in the capture of Christopher Boyce (Flight of the Falcon), and in the Green River Killer investigation.

Turner was also assigned to the Organized Crime squad in New York City, and was involved as a Psychological Profiler in the Abortion Clinic Bombings and the Central Park Preppie Murder. Turner pursued a degree in Forensic Psychology, and left the New York Division to become the first female Senior Resident Agent (SRA) in the FBI, assigned to Minot, North Dakota. Turner, as an Advanced Police Instructor, taught local, state and federal law enforcement in Criminal Profiling and Crime Scene Assessment, the Profiling of Sexual Offenders, and Interviewing Child Victims.

In 1999, Turner brought to the attention of her management team serious misconduct concerning failures to investigate and prosecute crimes against children in Indian country and in the Minot, North Dakota community. Turner also reported on misconduct related to the potential criminal theft of property from the 9/11 Ground Zero crime scene in New York City by Minneapolis FBI personnel.

In January 2007 a Minneapolis jury awarded Turner $500,000 (capped by law at $360,000) for retaliation and backpay for the agency's actions following her filing of a sexual discrimination claim.

In January 2008, the U.S. Government was ordered to pay $1 million in legal fees to Turner's lawyers.

In January 2015, the U.S. Government Accountability Office (GAO) conducted a study on the United States Department of Justice response to FBI whistleblower retaliation and cited Turner's case in their report. On March 4, 2015, the Senate held a hearing on about whistleblower retaliation at the FBI, in which Turner's case was featured.

References

External links
 National Whistleblower Center

Federal Bureau of Investigation agents
American whistleblowers
People from Minot, North Dakota
Living people
Year of birth missing (living people)